Alban Sumana Kingsford Bagbin (born 24 September 1957) is a Ghanaian politician who is the current Speaker of the Parliament of Ghana. He was the Minister for Health in the Ghana government from January 2012 until February 2013 when Hanny-Sherry Ayittey took over the position. He served as the Member of Parliament for Nadowli West constituency in the Upper West Region of Ghana in the 1st, 2nd, 3rd, 4th, 5th, 6th and 7th parliaments of the 4th republic of Ghana. He contested for the presidential candidate slot of the National Democratic Congress in 2019 but subsequently lost to former President John Dramani Mahama. On 7 January 2021 Bagbin was elected Speaker of 8th Parliament of the Fourth Republic.

Early life and education
Alban Sumana Kingsford Bagbin was born on 24 September 1957 to Sansunni Bagbin and  Margaret B. Bagbin who were both peasant farmers. He is the fourth child of nine children. He is a member of the Dagaaba ethnic group. He hails from Sombo, Upper West Region of Ghana. Alban Bagbin was educated at the Wa Secondary School and Tamale Secondary School. He obtained a Bachelor of Arts degree in Law and English at the University of Ghana in 1980.

He proceeded to the Ghana School of Law at Makola in Accra after which he was called to the bar in 1982. Bagbin also earned an  Executive Masters in Governance and Leadership from the Ghana Institute of Management and Public Administration (GIMPA).

Career 
Bagbin worked as the acting Secretary to the Statistical Service Board at the Bureau of Statistics and Statistical Service from 1980 to 1982. He worked as Personnel Manager of the erstwhile State Hotels Corporation consisting of Ambassador and Continental Hotels between 1982 and 1983, before relocating to Libya to teach English in Tripoli at the Suk Juma Secondary School.

Following Bagbin's return to Ghana in 1986, he joined Akyem Chambers, a law firm of legal practitioners, consultants and notaries public. As an attorney, eventually rising to become a partner. Whilst working at Okyeman Chambers, between 1989 and 1992, he was appointed as the external solicitor of the Nii Ngleshie royal family of James Town, Credit Unions Association of Ghana (CUA) and several other private business firms within Accra.

After working at Okyeman Chambers for 7 years, he moved from there in 1993 and to date is a partner of the Law Trust company, a legal firm of law practitioners, consultants and notaries public.

Political life
Bagbin is a member of the National Democratic Congress (NDC). He was first elected into Parliament during the 1992 Ghanaian General Elections. He represented the Nadowli West Constituency in the Upper West Region. In 2006, Bagbin announced his intentions to run for president in 2008 on the NDC ticket, but he never stood for the primaries. He became the Majority Leader in the Ghanaian parliament in 2009.

Following a cabinet reshuffle in January 2010, he was appointed Minister for Water Resources, Works and Housing by President Mills. He was also the Majority Leader of Parliament under President Mahama's tenure of office, he succeeded Benjamin Kunbuor, who was appointed as the Minister of Defense. He also served as the Second Deputy Speaker of Parliament from January 2017 to January 2021.

Member of Parliament 
1996 Elections

In 1996, Bagbin won the Nadowli North seat with 12,605 votes out of the 16,485 valid votes cast, representing 76.46% over NPP's Lawrence Banyen who polled 2,213 votes representing 13.42%, Yuoni Moses Vaalandzeri of the PNC polled 1,490 votes representing 9.04% and Baslide Kpemaal of the NCP polled 177 votes representing 1.07%.

2000 Elections

In the 2000 Ghanaian elections, Bagbin was retained his seat as the member of parliament for the Nadwoli North constituency. He won the elections with 9,004 votes out of the total votes cast, equivalent to 58.60% over Dr. Anleu-Mwine D.B, an independent candidate, Clement Kanfuri Senchi of the Peoples National Congress, Ningkpeng Pauline of the New Patriotic Party, John Bayon Boniface Wetol, Domayele Marcel Aston of the National Reform Party of the United Ghana Movement Party who obtained, 2,089 votes, 718 votes, 145 votes and 0 votes respectively.

2004 Elections

In 2004, ahead of the elections, Nadwoli North was split into two constituencies, Nadwoli West and Nadwoli East constituency. Bagbin was elected as the member of parliament for the Nadowli West constituency during 2004 elections. He was elected with 11,296 votes out of 22,349 total valid votes cast equivalent to 50.5%. He was elected over Clement K. Senchi of the People's National Convention, Daniel Anleu-Mwine Baga of the New Patriotic Party, Sasuu Bernard Kabawunu of the Convention People's Party, Bisung Edward of the Democratic People's Party and Dapilaa Ishak an independent candidate. who obtained 625 votes, 5,297 votes, 152 votes, 188 votes, 4,791 votes respectively.

Speaker of Parliament
Bagbin is the Speaker of the 8th Parliament of the Fourth Republic of Ghana. He was sworn in on 7 January 2021, after a well drawn out contest, after he was nominated by the Ghanaian Members of Parliament on the ticket of the National Democratic Congress. Bagbin defeated the incumbent, Mike Oquaye who was nominated by the New Patriotic Party for the position.

Personal life 
Bagbin is married to  Alice Adjua Yornas Bagbin, who is a Programme Officer of the UNICEF Office in Ghana. He is a Christian and worships as a Roman Catholic.

References

External links
GhanaDistricts.com
Ghana Parliament website

1957 births
Living people
Ghanaian Roman Catholics
20th-century Ghanaian lawyers
University of Ghana alumni
Ghanaian MPs 1993–1997
Ghanaian MPs 1997–2001
Ghanaian MPs 2001–2005
Ghanaian MPs 2005–2009
Ghanaian MPs 2009–2013
Ghanaian MPs 2013–2017
Ghanaian MPs 2017–2021
Place of birth missing (living people)
National Democratic Congress (Ghana) politicians
Ghana School of Law alumni
Health ministers of Ghana
21st-century Ghanaian politicians
21st-century Ghanaian lawyers
People from Upper West Region
Speakers of the Parliament of Ghana
Tamale Senior High School alumni